Human Impact are an American noise rock supergroup made up of members from Unsane, Swans, and Cop Shoot Cop.  Chris Spencer announced the band while also confirming that he will no longer be playing with Unsane. The band released their self titled debut album on March 13, 2020. This was followed by the non-album single "Contact" on April 7. The proceeds from the single went to the New York City COVID-19 emergency relief fund. On June 29, they released a further two singles, "Transit" and "Subversion".

History
Unsane and Cop Shoot Cop both formed in the late 1980s hardcore scene in New York City. During this time, Jim Coleman (CSC's keyboardist) and Chris Spencer (Unsane's vocalist and guitarist) developed a close friendship. Both bands became influential to noise rock, however it wasn't until 2018 that the two discussed forming a band. Chris Spencer commented: 

Drummer Phil Puleo and bassist Chris Pravdica joined later on. Puleo had played in CSC with Coleman, and in Swans with Pravdica.

Discography

Studio albums
 Human Impact (Ipecac) - 2020
 EP01 (Ipecac) - 2021

References

American noise rock music groups
Musical groups from New York City
American supergroups
Ipecac Recordings artists
Musical groups established in 2019
American industrial metal musical groups